KWNZ (106.3 FM) is a radio station licensed to Lovelock, Nevada, United States, broadcasting a Spanish Top 40 (CHR) format as "Latino 106.3". The station is owned by Lazer Broadcasting.

History

106-3 Pop-FM
On May 6, 2013 at 1:06pm, KWNZ signed as 106-3 Pop-FM with a Rhythmic AC format. The first song was "Pop Muzik" by M. On July 22, 2013, The station debuted their on-air lineup with Freddie Bueno hosting mornings, Melody Minx in middays, KWNZ alum "Wild Bill" Shakespeare in afternoons and Reno radio vet Rick Carter at night.

In March 2014, KWNZ added the syndicated The Bert Show for mornings and Matt Million for middays, who previously held down the midday shift on the original 97.3 KWNZ in the 1990s.

All Hit Radio
On November 14, 2014, KWNZ dropped the Rhythmic AC format for CHR/Top 40 as "106.3 Pop-FM, All Hit Radio". The on-air lineup remained the same until February 2015, when The Bert Show was dropped for local host AJ Miller. By late 2015, all air talent had been dropped from the station, with the exception of morning host, AJ Miller, who exited in February 2017. The rest of the day ran automated.

On August 3, 2017, it was announced that Shamrock Communications was exiting the Reno radio market and KWNZ was being sold to Lazer Broadcasting along with its two sister stations, KZTI and KNEZ. Its third sister station KRZQ was sold to locally owned Bighorn Media and flipped formats to Adult Standards.

Latino 106.3
In Early August 2017, all traces of the Pop-FM's social media and website were deleted, hinting at a new format for the station in the near future.

On August 18, 2017, KWNZ changed formats to Spanish Top 40 as "Latino 106.3".

References

KWNZ Sold To Lazer Broadcasting

External links

WNZ
Contemporary hit radio stations in the United States